Ceroplastes ceriferus, the Indian wax scale, is a species of scale insect in the family Coccidae. It is native to southern Asia and has spread to many other parts of the world.

Taxonomy
This species was first described in 1798 by the Danish botanist and entomologist Johan Christian Fabricius who gave it the name Coccus ceriferus. The type specimen came from India, probably occurring on Maytenus emarginata, however for nearly two hundred years the authorship was wrongly attributed to (James) Anderson. The insect was later transferred to the genus Ceroplastes, becoming Ceroplastes ceriferus.

Description
The adult female Ceroplastes ceriferus is immobile, being permanently attached by its mouthparts to the plant on which it is feeding. The body is hidden under a roughly convex, circular or oval covering of wax which it has secreted; this is white in nymphs and young adults, and becomes pinkish in older individuals. Adults have a forward-pointing waxy horn and there are waxy filaments projecting from the margin of the scale, giving the insect a daisy-flower-like appearance. In many populations, only females exist, giving birth by parthenogenesis.

Ecology
Ceroplastes ceriferus is a polyphagous insect, meaning that it feeds on a wide variety of different plants. It has been recorded as utilising plants in 108 genera in 60 different families as hosts. These include such cultivated crops as apple, pear, plum, citrus, mango, tamarind, fig, pomegranate, avocado, tea, coffee, squash and pepper, as well as many ornamental plants.

Pest status
Ceroplastes ceriferus can occur on branches, twigs and foliage. It feeds on the sap of its host plant causing lack of vigour, wilting, shedding of leaves and dieback. On poplar, one of the main hosts, the bark is discoloured and peels off in patches. On ornamental plants the insects are unattractive, and the honeydew they copiously produce encourages the growth of sooty mould, which is both unsightly and blocks out the light, reducing photosynthesis.

References

Coccidae
Hemiptera of Asia
Insects described in 1798
Taxa named by Johan Christian Fabricius